Turkey Creek is a stream in Jasper and Newton counties of southwest Missouri and Cherokee county of southeastern Kansas in the United States. It is a tributary of the Spring River.

The stream flows to the north into Jasper County and passes under I-44 southeast of Duenweg. It the turns to the northwest and flows past through the north side of Joplin passing under U.S. Route 71 and Missouri Route 43. It continues to the west-northwest past the community of Belleville and into southeastern Kansas.

Turkey Creek was named for the wild turkeys along its course.

See also
List of rivers of Kansas
List of rivers of Missouri

References

Rivers of Cherokee County, Kansas
Rivers of Jasper County, Missouri
Rivers of Newton County, Missouri
Rivers of Kansas
Rivers of Missouri